The New York City Department of Consumer and Worker Protection (DCWP), formerly the Department of Consumer Affairs (DCA), is a department of the government of New York City.

History
The duties were performed by the Commissioner of Public Markets until 1968. Bess Myerson was appointed by Mayor John Lindsay as the first commissioner of the Department for Consumer Affairs in 1969.

In 2019, the agency changed its name to the Department of Consumer and Worker Protection, expanding its role to protect workplace safety, paid sick leave laws, and freelancer protection.

Commissioners

See also
 New York City Office of Administrative Trials and Hearings (OATH), for hearings conducted on certain summonses issued by the Department
 New York City Public Advocate

References

External links

 Department of Consumer and Worker Protection in the Rules of the City of New York
 CityAdmin, a collection of NYC administrative decisions from the Center for New York City Law